The Russian First League (Pervaya liga), formerly called Russian First Division and Russian Football National League (FNL) is the second level of the Russian football league system.

The Russian Professional Football League (PFL) used to run the division. Since 2011, it has been managed by the Football National League.

The league consists of 18 clubs. After each season the two top clubs are promoted to the Premier League, and the bottom four clubs are relegated to the Russian Professional Football League. Third and fourth team play in home-and-away promotion play-offs against the 13th and 14th Premier League teams. In case one or more clubs are not licensed to participate for the upcoming season, the teams previously relegated are kept in the league instead, in the order of last season's standings. The reserve squads of the Premier League teams (such as FC Krasnodar-2) are not eligible for promotion, only for relegation.

History
Due to the dissolution of the Soviet Union, all Russian clubs of the former Soviet Top League and Soviet First League unified into the Russian Top Division, which meant that the new second tier of Russian football would remain regionalized.

On 10 June 2022, the number of teams in the league was reduced from 20 to 18 for the 2022–23 season. On the same day, the league requested Russian Football Union to rename the league to its historical name of Russian First League. RFU officially approved the name change on 23 June 2022. On the same date the league announced that the league's title sponsor would be a bookmaker Melbet.

2022–23 clubs 

 Akron Tolyatti
 Alania Vladikavkaz
 Arsenal Tula
 Baltika Kaliningrad
 Dynamo Makhachkala
 KAMAZ
 Rubin Kazan
 Krasnodar-2
 Kuban Krasnodar
 Neftekhimik Nizhnekamsk
 Rodina Moscow
 SKA-Khabarovsk
 Ufa
 Ulyanovsk
 Veles Moscow
 Volgar Astrakhan
 Yaroslavl
 Yenisey Krasnoyarsk

Winners and top scorers

See also
List of attendance figures at domestic professional sports leagues

References

External links
 Russian First League official website 

 
2
Russia
Professional sports leagues in Russia